Vincent Lo Hong-shui, GBM, GBS, JP (born 18 April 1948) is the chairman of Hong Kong-based Shui On Group, a building-materials and construction firm. He graduated from the University of New South Wales, Australia, in 1969. Upon returning to Hong Kong, started business with the sum of HK$100,000 (US$16,700) borrowed from his father, Hong Kong property tycoon Lo Ying-shek.

In 1984, Lo began investing in Shanghai and built a hotel in partnership with the Shanghainese Communist Youth League. The 1989 Tiananmen Square protests and massacre caused occupancy to plunge, and the league could not repay its construction loan. Lo assisted the league in dealing with the loan: Han Zheng was the Youth League secretary at the time, and is now mayor of Shanghai.

In association with Xu Kuangdi, a former Shanghai mayor, Han assisted Lo in gaining the right to develop a piece of land surrounding the hall where the Chinese Communist Party held its first meeting, now known as Xintiandi. The $170 million property development project is a 20,000 square meter complex of restaurants, bars and shops and is a prime entertainment spot in Shanghai. 

In 1995, he bought his first cement plant in Chongqing, which has enabled the Shui On Group to become one of China's top three cement companies. Under Lo's direction, the Shui On Group is carrying out property development projects in other Chinese cities, such as Wuhan, Dalian, Foshan and Hangzhou, as well as Chongqing. 

He was awarded the Grand Bauhinia Medal (GBM) by the Hong Kong SAR Government in 2017.

Family
Vincent Lo married his ex-wife Jean Ho (何晶潔) in 1985, they had 2 children together.

Vincent Lo and his current wife Loletta Chu married at 27 November 2008.

References

External links
Shui On Group
CNN Interview of Vincent Lo (transcript), 9 April 2007

1948 births
Living people
Hong Kong billionaires
Hong Kong chief executives
Hong Kong real estate businesspeople
University of New South Wales alumni
Recipients of the Gold Bauhinia Star
Recipients of the Grand Bauhinia Medal
Progressive Hong Kong Society politicians
Business and Professionals Federation of Hong Kong politicians
Members of the National Committee of the Chinese People's Political Consultative Conference
Members of the Preparatory Committee for the Hong Kong Special Administrative Region
Hong Kong Basic Law Consultative Committee members
Hong Kong Affairs Advisors
Members of the Selection Committee of Hong Kong
Members of the Election Committee of Hong Kong, 1998–2000
Members of the Election Committee of Hong Kong, 2000–2005
Members of the Election Committee of Hong Kong, 2007–2012
Members of the Election Committee of Hong Kong, 2012–2017